Rapala suffusa, the suffused flash, is a lycaenid or blue butterfly found in Myanmar, northern India, Assam, Thailand, Indochina and Palawan. The species was first described by Frederic Moore in 1878.

Subspecies
R. s. suffusa northern India, Assam, Thailand, Indochina
R. s. laima H. H. Druce, 1895 Borneo
R. s. praxeas Fruhstorfer, 1914 Java
R. s. catulus Fruhstorfer, 1912 Nias
R. s. barthema (Distant, 1885)
R. s. anabasis (Staudinger, 1889) Palawan

References

External links
 With images.

Rapala (butterfly)
Butterflies of Asia
Butterflies of Singapore
Butterflies described in 1878